BalletBoyz or Ballet Boyz are a London-based all-male dance company.

BalletBoyz was founded in 1999 by Michael Nunn and William Trevitt, both principal dancers with The Royal Ballet.  BalletBoyz was originally called George Piper Dances.

Productions

External links
 Archive footage of Michael Nunn and William Trevitt performing Yumba vs. Nonino in 2008 at Jacob's Pillow

References

1999 establishments in England
Dance companies in the United Kingdom
Ballet in London
Performing groups established in 1999